Celles-sur-Ource (literally Celles on Ource) is a commune in the Aube department in north-central France.

Geography
The village lies in the northwestern part of the commune, on the left bank of the Ource, which flows northwest through the middle of the commune.

Population

See also
Communes of the Aube department

References

Communes of Aube
Aube communes articles needing translation from French Wikipedia